is a PlayStation game published by Bandai, based on the anime of the same name.

The game was never released outside Japan.

Gameplay
The player controls Spike Spiegel's Swordfish II from a third-person perspective. Each level involves chasing another ship (the bounty head) along a set track through different environments, while enemies (spaceships, robots, etc.) attack. Each stage ends with a boss battle, where the player confronts their target.

Between stages, bonus points earned can be used to purchase upgrades for the ship (faster speed, more powerful ammo, stronger laser).

Cast
In the same way that characters interacted with the player in Star Fox, series regulars Jet Black, Faye Valentine, and Edward appear on screen to offer advice. Each character is voiced by their original Japanese voice actor. Other series regular Ein also occasionally appears.

Music
Shinsuke Sugiuchi composed the soundtrack for the game which greatly diverges from the TV show in style.

References

External links
 Gamespot page
 IGN page
 Ex Magazine  - Game review with images

1998 video games
PlayStation (console)-only games
Cowboy Bebop
Scrolling shooters
Japan-exclusive video games
Video games based on anime and manga
Bandai games
PlayStation (console) games
Video games developed in Japan
Video games scored by Yoko Kanno
Single-player video games
Space Western video games